Jonathan Frid (December 2, 1924 – April 14, 2012) was a Canadian actor, best known for his role as vampire Barnabas Collins on the gothic television soap opera Dark Shadows.

Biography

Early life and career
Frid was born of Scottish and English ancestry in Hamilton, Ontario, Canada. His birth name was John Herbert Frid. He was the youngest son of homemaker Isabel Flora (née McGregor) and Herbert Percival "H.P." Frid, a construction executive.

Frid served in the Royal Canadian Navy during World War II. He graduated from McMaster University in Hamilton in 1948, and the following year was accepted at the Royal Academy of Dramatic Arts in London. He moved to the United States in 1954, and received a Master of Fine Arts (MFA) degree in Directing from the Yale School of Drama in 1957. As a student at Yale in 1956, he starred in the premiere of William Snyder's play A True and Special Friend. He went on to star in the first productions at the Williamstown Theater in Williamstown, Massachusetts and stage productions in Canada, England and the United States.

He began using the stage name Jonathan Frid (rather than John Frid) in 1962, and made his Broadway debut as an understudy in the 1964 play Roar Like a Dove.

Television
Early television roles with the Canadian Broadcasting Corporation included parts in Julius Caesar, 20,000 Leagues Under the Sea, Our Town, and The Picture of Dorian Gray.

Frid is widely known for the role of vampire Barnabas Collins in the original gothic serial Dark Shadows, which ran from 1966-71 and in which he appeared in 594 episodes. He also starred as Barnabas in the 1970 movie House of Dark Shadows. In 1967, Frid had made plans to move to the U.S. West Coast to pursue a career as an acting teacher when he won the role that ultimately made him a household name. As Frid explained on his Web site, he had barely entered his apartment as the phone call from his agent came informing him that he had won the role of Barnabas Collins. He agreed to accept it after being told it was a short-term one that would provide him with extra cash while he prepared to move. As the character's popularity soared, Frid scrapped those plans.

After Dark Shadows ended in 1971, he returned to performing in live theatre full-time with starring roles in the Broadway plays Murder in the Cathedral as Thomas Becket and Wait Until Dark as Harry Roat. Frid had previously played the role of a psychiatrist on the CBS Television soap opera As the World Turns. In 1973, Frid appeared in the TV movie The Devil's Daughter, starring Shelley Winters, and the following year starred in Oliver Stone's directorial debut, Seizure. In 1978, he returned to Canada for a time and later returned to New York City in the early 1980s.

Later career
Frid began performing readings at Dark Shadows fan conventions in the 1980s and while developing ideas for his one-man shows. He succeeded Abe Vigoda, also a Dark Shadows alumnus, as Jonathan Brewster in the 1986–87 Broadway revival of Arsenic and Old Lace.

In 1994, he retired and returned to Canada. He continued to perform one-man shows for charities in both Canada and the United States. In 2000, he starred in the play Mass Appeal which enjoyed a successful, limited run in Hamilton and at the Stirling Festival Theatre in Stirling, Ontario.

Frid attended Dark Shadows conventions in New York in August 2007, Burbank, California, in July 2008, and Elizabeth, New Jersey, in August 2009. In 2010, he returned to the role of Barnabas for the first time in 39 years in a Dark Shadows audio drama, The Night Whispers. Along with former Dark Shadows castmates Lara Parker, David Selby, and Kathryn Leigh Scott, he spent three days at Pinewood Studios in June 2011 filming a cameo appearance as a guest in the "happening" scene for the 2012 Tim Burton Dark Shadows film, which became his final film appearance.

Death
Frid died at Juravinski Hospital in Hamilton, Ontario, of pneumonia and complications after a fall. While some sources at the time variously reported the date of his death as April 13 or April 14, Frid's nephew, David Howitt, confirmed that Frid died in the early hours of April 14, 2012. Howitt added that while Friday the 13th "makes for good press... it’s good to get it right."

Filmography

References

External links

 (official site). Archived from the original on July 20, 2011.

Further reading
 

1924 births
2012 deaths
Canadian military personnel from Ontario
20th-century Canadian male actors
21st-century Canadian male actors
Alumni of RADA
Canadian male film actors
Canadian male soap opera actors
Canadian male stage actors
Canadian people of English descent
Canadian people of Scottish descent
Deaths from pneumonia in Ontario
Male actors from Hamilton, Ontario
Male actors from New York City
McMaster University alumni
Yale School of Drama alumni
Canadian expatriate male actors in the United States
Royal Canadian Navy personnel of World War II